The International Council for Scientific and Technical Information (ICSTI) aims to promote cooperation among all those engaged in the scientific communication process by engaging national scientific unions and their respective scientific communities. It is a broad-based, international, not-for-profit membership organization based in Paris, France.

The highest authority is the General Assembly consisting of representatives of all members, which convenes once a year. There are normally two meetings in Europe followed by one in North America or another region.

The organization is led by an executive board which has all power to carry on the business of ICSTI between meetings of the General Assembly. Jan Brase (TIB – DataCite) is the present president for the 2013–2016 triennium.

Activities 
Recent meetings of ICSTI have covered the topics of:

Non-Textual Information - Strategy and Innovation Beyond Text, held on 16–17 March 2013 in Hannover, Germany, hosted by the German National Library of Science and Technology - TIB

Science, Ethics and the Law ’, held on 15–16 October 2012 in Washington, D.C., hosted by the Library of Congress

Delivering Data in Science, held on 3–4 March 2012 in Paris, France, at the Headquarters of ICSU - the International Council for Science

Upgrading Information to Knowledge, held on 7–8 June 2011 in Beijing, China, hosted by ISTIC, the Institute of Scientific and Technical Information of China

External links
Current Membership 
Upcoming events organized by ICSTI. 
Past Events organized by ICSTI 

Members of the International Council for Science
International scientific organizations
Members of the International Science Council